The 2012 United States Senate election in Ohio took place on November 6, 2012, concurrently with the 2012 U.S. presidential election as well as other elections to the United States Senate and House of Representatives and various state and local elections. Incumbent Democratic U.S. Senator Sherrod Brown won re-election to a second term, defeating Republican Josh Mandel, the Ohio State Treasurer. He was unopposed in the Democratic primary and Mandel won the Republican primary with 63% of the vote.

Democratic primary

Results

Republican primary

Candidates

Filed 
 Russell Bliss
 David Dodt
 Donna Glisman, retired entrepreneur
 Eric LaMont Gregory, medical scientist
 Josh Mandel, Ohio State Treasurer
 Michael Pryce, surgeon

Withdrew 
 Kevin Coughlin, former Ohio state senator (dropped out)

Endorsements 
Josh Mandel was endorsed by Rob Portman, U.S. Senator (R-OH); Jim DeMint, U.S. Senator (R-SC); Jim Jordan, U.S. Congressman (R-OH);  Club for Growth; National Rifle Association; Tea Party Express; Jeb Bush, Former Governor of Florida; John McCain, U.S. Senator (R-AZ); Marco Rubio, U.S. Senator (R-FL); Chris Christie, Governor of New Jersey;  Afghanistan & Iraq Veterans for Congress (AIVC); Buckeye Firearms Association National Right to Life Committee; Ohio Right to Life; and National Federation of Independent Business

Results

General election

Candidates 
 Sherrod Brown (Democratic), incumbent U.S. Senator
 Josh Mandel (Republican), Ohio State Treasurer
 Scott Rupert (Independent), truck driver

Debates 
Complete video of debate, October 15, 2012 - C-SPAN
Complete video of debate, October 25, 2012 - C-SPAN

Campaign 
In 2006, U.S. Representative Sherrod Brown defeated two-term incumbent Republican U.S. Senator Mike DeWine 56%-44% 2006 election. Over the next six years, he established a very liberal, progressive, and populist record. The National Journal named Brown the most liberal U.S. Senator in the past two years. The Washington Post called him a "modern-day Paul Wellstone." One article said "Brown is way to the left of Ohio in general, but probably the only person who could outwork Brown is Portman." Brown is the only candidate the 60 Plus Association targeted in the 2012 election cycle.

Mandel, 34, was elected state treasurer in 2010. Before that, he was a Lyndhurst City Councilman and Ohio State Representative. He was criticized as Ohio Treasurer for not fulfilling his pledge to serve a four-year term and for not attending any of the Board of Deposit monthly meetings. However, Mandel raised a lot of money. He was called a rising star in the Republican Party and was called "the rock star of the party." He was also compared to Marco Rubio.

Mandel's campaign was singled out by the independent fact-checking group Politifact for its "casual relationship with the truth" and its tendency to "double down" after inaccuracies were pointed out. The fact-checking group wrote: "For all the gifts Mandel has, from his compelling personal narrative as an Iraq war veteran to a well-oiled fundraising machine, whoppers are fast becoming a calling card of his candidacy."

Mandel raised $7.2 million through the first quarter of 2012. He had $5.3 million cash on hand, trailing Brown's $6.3 million. However, Mandel benefited from massive support from conservative out-of-state superPACs, which raise unlimited amounts of money from anonymous donors. These outside groups, including Crossroads GPS, aired over $60 million in TV advertising supporting Mandel and attacking Brown, outspending Democratically aligned outside groups by more than five-to-one. Mandel's campaign was aided by over $1 million spent primarily on attack ads by a 501(c)(4) organization called the Government Integrity Fund. The group was funded by anonymous donors and run by lobbyist Tom Norris of Columbus, Ohio-based Cap Square Solutions.

Endorsements 
Brown was endorsed by the Cleveland Plain Dealer, the Columbus Dispatch, the Toledo Blade, the Youngstown Vindicator, The Cincinnati Enquirer, and the Akron Beacon-Journal.

Mandel was endorsed by the Warren Tribune-Chronicle and the Marietta Times.

Fundraising

Top contributors

Top industries

Predictions

Polling 

Democratic primary

Republican primary

General election

Results

By congressional district
Brown won 6 of 16 congressional districts, including the 10th and 14th  districts, which elected Republicans to the House.

See also 
 2012 United States Senate elections
 2012 United States House of Representatives elections in Ohio

References

External links 
 Ohio Secretary of State - Elections 
 Campaign contributions at OpenSecrets.org
 Outside spending at Sunlight Foundation
 Candidate issue positions at On the Issues

Official campaign websites
 Sherrod Brown for U.S. Senate
 Josh Mandel for U.S. Senate

2012 Ohio elections
Ohio
2012
Sherrod Brown